Olivette is an inner-ring suburb of St. Louis, located in St. Louis County, Missouri, United States. The population was 8,504 at the 2020 census.

History
Olivette was settled in the mid-19th century as a small farming community along an old Indian trail originally called the Bonhomme Road (now known as Old Bonhomme, which meets and essentially turns into Olive Boulevard).  Olive Road is a ridge road and at one time served as a de facto boundary for housing segregation in outer St. Louis.

The first brick schoolhouse in St. Louis County was built in the 1850s at the corner of Price and Old Bonhomme in Olivette. Logos High School is built on the former grounds of the schoolhouse.

In the 1920s, St. Louis decided to build a water reservoir in Olivette since it was one of the highest points in St. Louis County. The reservoir was built at Brock's Pond, a local recreational spot, and finished in 1926. Stacy Park was formed around the reservoir and is now the largest park in Olivette.

Olivette was incorporated in 1930 by combining the communities of Central, Tower Hill, Olive, and Stratmann. Prior to merging, the area was known as Central due to its centralized location along the Central Plank Road (again, now called Olive Boulevard). In fact, Price Road and Olive Boulevard intersect at the exact midpoint between the Port of St. Louis on the Mississippi River and Howell's Landing on the Missouri River. Central was a high traffic stop for wagons to restock on their journey between the two stops. O.

Olivette is one of the few communities in St. Louis County that maintains their own municipal fire department and police department.

Geography
Olivette is located at  (38.672951, -90.377328).

Key roads through Olivette include Missouri Route 340 (Olive Boulevard), Price Road, Dielman Road, Old Bonhomme Road and Interstate 170.

Olivette's neighbors include Overland and unincorporated St. Louis County to the north, Creve Coeur to the west, Ladue to the south, and University City to the east. The Monsanto Corporation used to be located partially in Olivette until it was acquired by Bayer in 2018.

Olivette has one of the highest elevations in St. Louis County at 700 feet.

Demographics

2020 census
As of the 2020 census there were 8,504 people, and 2,926 households living in the city. The racial makeup of the city was 52.4% White, 22.4% African American, 0.4% Native American, 16.7% Asian, 1.0% from other races, and 7.2% from two or more races. Hispanic or Latino of any race were 3.5% of the population.

2010 census
At the 2010 census there were 7,737 people, 3,068 households, and 2,216 families living in the city. The racial makeup of the city was 60.9% White, 23.9% African American, 0.2% Native American, 10.7% Asian, 1.7% from other races, and 2.6% from two or more races. Hispanic or Latino of any race were 3.3%.

Of the 3,068 households 35.8% had children under the age of 18 living with them, 54.0% were married couples living together, 14.4% had a female householder with no husband present, 3.9% had a male householder with no wife present, and 27.8% were non-families. 24.1% of households were one person and 10.1% were one person aged 65 or older. The average household size was 2.52 and the average family size was 3.00.

The median age was 41.8 years. 25.6% of residents were under the age of 18; 6% were between the ages of 18 and 24; 22.7% were from 25 to 44; 29.4% were from 45 to 64; and 16.4% were 65 or older. The gender makeup of the city was 46.9% male and 53.1% female.

2000 census
At the 2000 census there were 7,438 people, 3,096 households, and 2,173 families living in the city. The racial makup of the city was 70.38% White, 21.90% African American, 0.08% Native American, 5.00% Asian, 0.01% Pacific Islander, 0.75% from other races, and 1.87% from two or more races. Hispanic or Latino of any race were 1.57%.

Of the 3,096 households 31.5% had children under the age of 18 living with them, 54.2% were married couples living together, 12.7% had a female householder with no husband present, and 29.8% were non-families. 25.8% of households were one person and 10.4% were one person aged 65 or older. The average household size was 2.40 and the average family size was 2.91.

The age distribution was 23.8% under the age of 18, 5.8% from 18 to 24, 25.4% from 25 to 44, 27.7% from 45 to 64, and 17.3% 65 or older. The median age was 42 years. For every 100 females, there were 89.0 males. For every 100 females age 18 and over, there were 84.5 males.

The median household income was $57,669 and the median family income  was $67,569. Males had a median income of $49,853 versus $35,278 for females. The per capita income for the city was $32,379. About 3.6% of families and 4.3% of the population were below the poverty line, including 3.8% of those under age 18 and 0.7% of those age 65 or over.

Education
The public Ladue School District serves all of Olivette. Old Bonhomme Elementary School is located within the city limits. Ladue High School serves high school students in Olivette. Private schools located within the city include Logos High School, Epstein Hebrew Academy, and Immanuel Lutheran School (Olivette).

Parks and Recreation
Stacy Park is a 35 acre park located on the border of Olivette and Creve Coeur. The park has several walking paths, several multi-use fields, basketball court, pavilion, playground, a prairie garden, several outdoor BBQs and a public restroom.

Notable people
John Green, ABC News executive
Sterling K. Brown, actor

References

External links
 City of Olivette

Cities in St. Louis County, Missouri
Cities in Missouri